Baron Anton Antonovich Delvig (Moscow – , St. Petersburg) was a Russian poet and journalist of Baltic German ethnicity.

Life 
Anton Delvig was of Baltic-German descent from paternal side. He studied in the Tsarskoye Selo Lyceum together with Alexander Pushkin and Wilhelm Küchelbecker with whom he became close friends. Küchelbecker dedicated a poem ('O, Delvig') to him; this poem was later set to music by Dmitri Shostakovich in the ninth movement of his fourteenth symphony. Delvig is also mentioned in Pushkin's famous novel in verse Eugene Onegin, being compared to the young poet Lensky. Delvig commissioned a portrait of Pushkin from Orest Kiprensky, which Pushkin bought from Delvig's widow after his friend's death. In 1820, Delvig met Yevgeny Baratynsky and introduced him to the literary press.

In his poetry, Delvig upheld the waning traditions of Russian Neoclassicism. He became interested in Russian folklore and wrote numerous imitations of folk songs. Some of these were put to music by the composers Alexander Alyabyev and Mikhail Glinka.

As a journalist, Delvig edited the periodical Northern Flowers (1825–1831), in which Pushkin was a regular contributor. In 1830–1831, he co-edited with Pushkin the Literaturnaya Gazeta, which was banned by the Tsarist government after information laid by Thaddeus Bulgarin.

Notes

References

External links

1798 births
1831 deaths
Writers from Moscow
People from Moskovsky Uyezd
Baltic-German people
Barons of the Russian Empire
Poets from the Russian Empire
Russian male poets
Journalists from the Russian Empire
Russian male journalists
Male writers from the Russian Empire
Romantic poets
19th-century writers from the Russian Empire
19th-century poets
19th-century male writers from the Russian Empire
Tsarskoye Selo Lyceum alumni
Deaths from typhus
Burials at Tikhvin Cemetery